Late Lament may refer to:

 A part of the song "Nights in White Satin"
 A composition by Paul Desmond, first recorded on his album Desmond Blue